Fred James Cook (March 8, 1911 – April 4, 2003) was an American investigative journalist, author and historian who has been published extensively in The Nation, the Asbury Park Press and The New York Times. He wrote from a contemporary perspective about the Hindenburg disaster, Alger Hiss, the FBI, the Cuban Missile Crisis, Barry Goldwater, the Watergate scandal, the Mafia, the Ku Kux Klan, political bosses and healthcare in the United States. He has also written about historic events such as the American Revolutionary War, P.T. Barnum, the Pinkertons and Theodore Roosevelt.

In 1967, Cook successfully sued the religious broadcaster WGCB for maligning him in a landmark case that led the United States Supreme Court in 1969 to uphold the fairness doctrine. 

He is the author of 45 books and a winner of the Heywood Broun Award for exposing social injustice.

Early life
Cook was born in Point Pleasant, New Jersey, and grew up in a house on Bay Avenue near the border with Bay Head. On his mother's side, he was descended from an old New Jersey family, the Comptons. He graduated from Rutgers University in 1932.

Career
Cook began his career in journalism first as a rewrite man and then as a reporter for the Asbury Park Press. He later wrote for the New York World-Telegram, focusing on crime reporting. He uncovered the confession of John Francis Roche in the murder case of Navy sailor Edward S. Bates, which freed Paul A. Pfeffer, who had been convicted of the murder.

While editor of the weekly New Jersey Courier in Lakewood, New Jersey, he covered the nearby 1937 Hindenburg disaster. Having witnessed the airship flying overhead at Toms River, New Jersey, he first wrote about its anticipated safe arrival at the Lakehurst Naval Air Station, then had to quickly rewrite the story after getting to the crash site while the ship was still in flames. A few hundred copies of the earlier edition, with the wrong story, were already on their way to news stands, "so I knew I had to collar them and get them back," Cook said.

Though conservative in many respects, Cook wrote a number of articles for The Nation magazine, together with his longtime World-Telegram collaborator, Gene Gleason, and took positions usually identified with the left.  For instance, he opposed the death penalty, taking the position that it was cruel and didn't deter crime.  He was also highly critical of the FBI, the CIA, and the Alger Hiss perjury conviction, as well as oil companies and defense contractors.  His writing made him the target of FBI investigations against him.

For The New York Times, Cook wrote about spending time inside Sing Sing state prison, militant community organizers in Newark, and environmental catastrophes in other parts of New Jersey. He also wrote an Op-Ed about the 1979 oil crisis for The Washington Post that provoked a response from a senior director at the American Petroleum Institute. He has also written about the American Revolutionary War and the La Amistad slave ship rebellion for American Heritage magazine.

In 1968, Cook signed the "Writers and Editors War Tax Protest" pledge, vowing to refuse tax payments in protest against the Vietnam War.

Cook and Alger Hiss 
Cook had written four articles for The Nation by the time editor Carey McWilliams asked him to write an article about the perjury case of Alger Hiss.  Cook did not want to do the article, thinking Hiss was "guilty as hell."  After two more requests by McWilliams for Cook to do the article, McWilliams said, "Look, I have a proposition to make you. I know how you feel about the case, but I've talked to a lot of people who I trust. They say if anybody looked hard at the evidence they'd have a different opinion. You're known as a fact man. Will you do this for me? No obligation. Will you at least look at the facts?" Cook decided that, as a good journalist, he was obligated to look at the facts and see where they took him.

The September 21, 1957 issue of The Nation was dedicated entirely to Cook's investigation of the Hiss case, which was called, "Hiss: New Perspectives on the Strangest Case of our Time." In the article Cook wrote for The Nation, he ultimately was of the opinion that Hiss was not guilty of the accusations made by Whittaker Chambers who accused Hiss of being a Soviet spy while working for the US State Department.

Cook expanded the article into a book entitled, The Unfinished Story of Alger Hiss (Morrow, 1957) and to the end of his life continued to maintain that Hiss had been innocent. In an interview he gave at the age of 89 Cook observed:And as a matter of fact, I don't think the book was ever challenged. If I had made some grievous error, they would have been down on my head right away, but it didn't happen. That said to me that I was pretty damned accurate. And everything I saw in the FBI documents in the 1970s just confirmed that I was right.

Scandal 
Cook and Gleason were fired by the World-Telegram in 1959 after writing an issue-length expose, "The Shame of New York", for The Nation. The men appeared on David Susskind's TV show, "Open End", during which Gleason claimed a high-ranking New York City official had offered him a bribewell-paid government jobs for the two reporters' wivesto stop investigating the city's slum clearance program in 1956. But when Manhattan District Attorney Frank Hogan hauled him in for questioning, Gleason back-pedaled, saying he had "exaggerated" the story "because I was exuberant and carried away." At that point, the World-Telegram fired him. Cook claimed that he'd reported the alleged bribe attempt to his superiors, but his city editor denied ever hearing about the bribe. Cook asserted in his autobiography that Gleason had been pressured by World-Telegram owner Roy W. Howard to back off his controversial claim about bribery. A Newsday investigation later identified a long tradition of New York politicians putting reporters on campaign or government payrolls even as they continued covering the news.

Supreme Court case 
Cook's 1964 book, Goldwater: Extremist on the Right, initiated a series of events which in the end led to the Supreme Court decision in what is known as the Red Lion case: After the book appeared, Cook was attacked by conservative evangelist Billy James Hargis on his daily Christian Crusade radio broadcast, on WGCB in Red Lion, Pennsylvania. Hargis also appeared to be angry about an article Cook wrote called "Hate Clubs of the Air" that referenced him in the Nation. Cook sued, arguing that under the FCC's Fairness Doctrine he was entitled to a right of reply. He won the case, but Red Lion Broadcasting challenged the constitutionality of the doctrine, and their case against the FCC went to the Supreme Court in 1969. The Court ruled unanimously that the Fairness Doctrine was constitutional.

Personal life 
Cook's first wife Julia died from complications from taking blood-thinners after open-heart surgery in 1974. He wrote a book about it called "Julia's Story: The Tragedy of an Unnecessary Death." He remarried and was survived by two children and six grandchildren.

Cook died at the age of 92 at his home in Interlaken, New Jersey, on April 4, 2003.

Works

This is an incomplete list that doesn't include all the nonfiction written for children and young adults, his fiction and his works published in magazines and newspapers.

"Hiss: New Perspectives On The Strangest Case Of Our Time", The Nation, September 21,1957
"The Unfinished Story of Alger Hiss", Morrow, 1958.
"What Manner of Men: Forgotten Heroes of the Revolution", Morrow, 1959. 
"Rallying a Free People: Theodore Roosevelt", Kingston House, 1961. 
"Entertaining the world P. T. Barnum", Encyclopaedia Britannica Press, 1962 
"The Warfare State," Macmillan, 1962. 
"The FBI Nobody Knows", Macmillan, 1964. Excerpt in True, the Men's Magazine. 
"Barry Goldwater: Extremist of the Right", Grove, 1964. 
"The Corrupted Land: The Social Morality of Modern Americans", Macmillan, 1966.
"The Secret Rulers: Criminal Syndicates and How They Control the U.S. Underworld", Duell, Sloan & Pearce, 1966. 
"The Plot against the Patient", Prentice-Hall, 1967. 
"What So Proudly We Hailed", Prentice-Hall, 1968. 
"The New Jersey Colony", Crowell-Collier Press, 1969. 
"The Nightmare Decade: The Life and Times of Senator Joe McCarthy", Random House, 1971. 
"The Army-McCarthy Hearings, April–June, 1954: A Senator Creates a Sensation Hunting Communists", Franklin Watts, 1971. 
"The Rise of American Political Parties", Franklin Watts, 1971. 
"The Cuban Missile Crisis, October, 1962: The U.S. and Russia Face a Nuclear Showdown", Franklin Watts, 1972. 
"The Muckrakers: Crusading Journalists Who Changed America", Doubleday, 1972. 
"The U-2 Incident, May, 1960: An American Spy Plane Downed over Russia Intensifies the Cold War", Franklin Watts, 1973. 
"Dawn over Saratoga: The Turning Point of the Revolutionary War", Doubleday, 1973. 
"Mafia", Fawcett, 1973. 
"American Political Bosses and Machines", Franklin Watts, 1973. 
"The Pinkertons", Doubleday, 1974. 
"Lobbying in American Politics", Franklin Watts, 1976. 
"Privateers of `76", illustrated by William L. Verrill, Jr., Bobbs-Merrill, 1976. 
"Julia's Story: The Tragedy of an Unnecessary Death", Holt, 1976.
"Mob, Inc.", Franklin Watts, 1977. 
"City Cop: The True Story of a Young Cop's First Years on the Force", Doubleday, 1979 
"The Ku Klux Klan: America's Recurring Nightmare", Messner, 1980. 
"The Crimes of Watergate", Franklin Watts, 1981. 
"The Great Energy Scam: Private Billions vs. Public Good", Macmillan, 1982. 
"Maverick: Fifty Years of Investigative Reporting" (autobiography), introduction by Studs Terkel, Putnam, 1984.

See also 

 Studs discusses McCarthyism with journalist Fred J. Cook at Studs Terkel Radio Archive. Broadcast: Jul. 27, 1971.

References

External links
 Obituary in The New York Times, May 4, 2003
Obituary in The Independent, May 9, 2003

1911 births
2003 deaths
American investigative journalists
American political writers
American male non-fiction writers
American tax resisters
The Nation (U.S. magazine) people
People from Interlaken, New Jersey
People from Point Pleasant, New Jersey
People from Monmouth County, New Jersey
Rutgers University alumni
Writers from New Jersey
20th-century American male writers
20th-century American historians
American historians of espionage